Lee Bu-ti (born 11 April 1941) is a Taiwanese gymnast. He competed in eight events at the 1964 Summer Olympics.

References

1941 births
Living people
Taiwanese male artistic gymnasts
Olympic gymnasts of Taiwan
Gymnasts at the 1964 Summer Olympics
Place of birth missing (living people)